The Romanian Women's Cup (Romanian: Cupa României Fotbal Feminin) is the national women's football cup competition in Romania. The first edition of the cup was played out in the autumn of 2004, after the league season. The most titles are held by Olimpia Cluj, who won eight finals: five consecutive between 2011 and 2015, one in 2017 and two more as U Olimpia Cluj in 2021 and 2022.

Format
As there are very few women's football teams listed in the country, the cup usually has a low number of entries.
In the early years, along league teams, some non-league teams also participated.
After the reintroduction of a second league in the Romanian women's football structure, starting with the 2013–14 season, second teams of clubs were allowed to play in the cup, up until the 2016–17 season. However, since the 2017–18 season, a club can only enter one team in the cup.

Some teams have to play preliminary matches, some start directly in the quarter finals, depending on the league. 
Usually in the early rounds, the teams are paired by a geographical criterion, in order to minimize travel costs. 
Most games were played one-legged and are hosted by the team in the lowest league or with the weakest record in the previous season.
In some years, the semifinals were played on neutral ground.
The final always has been one-legged, but in 2011 the semi-finals were played with a home and away match.

List of finals
The list of finals:

Performances

Performance by club

Performance by city

See also
Romanian Cup, men's edition

References

External links
Official website
Cup at soccerway.com

rom
Football cup competitions in Romania
Recurring sporting events established in 2004
Cup